Charle Edward Young (born February 5, 1951) is an American former professional football player who was a tight end for 13 seasons in the National Football League (NFL) for the Philadelphia Eagles (1973–1976), the Los Angeles Rams (1977–1979), the San Francisco 49ers  (1980–1982), and the Seattle Seahawks (1983–1985). He was drafted by the Eagles in the first round of the 1973 NFL Draft. He played college football for the USC Trojans.

Early life
Young attended Edison High School in Fresno, California, where he led his high school basketball team to the valley playoffs. Following high school, he went on to a college and professional career playing football.

College career
A unanimous first-team All-America in 1972, Young appeared in the Hula Bowl and College All-Star Game.  A First-team All-Conference selection, he led USC to a Pacific-8 Conference title and a national championship in 1972. Named USC's Lineman of the Year in 1972, Young set a school record for receptions by a tight end with 62.  In three seasons, he amassed 1,008 receiving yards and ten touchdowns.  He was inducted into the College Football Hall of Fame in 2004.

Professional career
Following graduation, Young earned Rookie of the Year honors with the Philadelphia Eagles in 1973 and went on to play for 13 seasons in the NFL with four teams.  He played in the Pro Bowl in 1973, 1974 and 1975, played in Super Bowl XIV with the Los Angeles Rams in 1979, and won Super Bowl XVI with the San Francisco 49ers in 1981.  He was a key contributor on the final 89-yard drive that led to the play that has been immortalized as "The Catch" in the 1981 NFC Playoffs versus the Dallas Cowboys. He also played with the Los Angeles Rams and Seattle Seahawks.

After football
Young volunteers with the United Way of America, the Fred Hutchinson Cancer Society, and the Pacific Northwest Athletic Congress. A volunteer for the 1990 Goodwill Games, he participated in the Black Men Professional Breakfast and is a board member of the Wee Care Childcare Center.

References

External links

 
 

1951 births
Living people
American football tight ends
Los Angeles Rams players
Philadelphia Eagles players
San Francisco 49ers players
Seattle Seahawks players
USC Trojans football players
All-American college football players
College Football Hall of Fame inductees
National Conference Pro Bowl players
Sportspeople from Fresno, California
Players of American football from California
African-American players of American football
21st-century African-American people
20th-century African-American sportspeople